The Mouth of Truth is a marble mask in Rome, Italy, which stands against the left wall of the portico of the Santa Maria in Cosmedin church, at the  Piazza della Bocca della Verità, the site of the ancient Forum Boarium (the ancient cattle market). According to enduring medieval legend, it will bite off the hand of any liar who places their hand in its mouth, or, alternatively, any who utters a lie while their hand is in the mouth.  It still attracts many visitors who audaciously insert their hands.

The massive marble mask weighs about 1300 kg (2800 lbs) and probably depicts the face of the sea titan god Oceanus. The eyes, nostrils and mouth are open.  Historians aren't quite certain what the original purpose of the disc was. It was possibly used as a drain cover in the nearby Temple of Hercules Victor, which had an oculus—a round open space in the middle of the roof, similar to that of the Pantheon. Hence, it could rain inside. It is also thought that cattle merchants used it to drain the blood of cattle sacrificed to the god Hercules. In the thirteenth century the disc was probably removed from the temple and placed against the wall of the Santa Maria in Cosmedin. In the seventeenth century it eventually moved to its current location inside the portico of the church.

Cultural references and derivative works

The Mouth of Truth has been featured as a theme in historical European art. Lucas Cranach the Elder, a German painter during the Renaissance period, created two paintings depicting a woman placing her hand in the mouth of a statue of a lion while onlookers watched, a subject which was drawn by Albrecht Altdorfer and made into a woodcut by the Dutch printmaker Lucas van Leyden.

The Mouth of Truth is now known mostly from its appearance in the 1953 film Roman Holiday. The film also uses the Mouth of Truth as a storytelling device since both Hepburn's and Peck's characters are not initially truthful with each other.
In Het geheim van de afgebeten vingers by Dutch writer Rindert Kromhout, the fingers of lying children are cut off with a scythe by a skeleton who lives in the Capuchin Crypt in the Santa Maria della Concezione dei Cappuccini.

There are a number of Bocca della Verità replicas and derivative works. A full-size reproduction sits in the Alta Vista Gardens in California and one of Jules Blanchard's sculptures in the Luxembourg Garden in Paris depicts a woman with her hand in the sculpture's mouth. Coin-operated fortune teller machines have been developed and installed in different parts of the world, including one on display in the Musée Mécanique in San Francisco.

Gallery

Notes

References
Snyder, James. Northern Renaissance Art, 1985, Harry N. Abrams,

External links
 

Mascarons
1st-century Roman sculptures
Tourist attractions in Rome
Rome R. XII Ripa
Truth
Reliefs in Italy